Huesera: The Bone Woman is a 2022 supernatural body horror film directed and co-written by Michelle Garza Cervera in her feature film directorial debut. It stars Natalia Solián as Valeria, a pregnant woman who finds herself threatened by occult forces. Alongside Solián, the film's cast includes Alfonso Dosal, Mayra Batalla, Mercedes Hernández, Sonia Couoh and Aida López.

Huesera: The Bone Woman had its world premiere at the Tribeca Festival on 9 June 2022 and won the Best New Narrative Director and Nora Ephron awards.

Cast
 Natalia Solián as Valeria
 Alfonso Dosal as Raúl, Valeria's husband
 Mayra Batalla as Octavia
 Mercedes Hernández as Isabel
 Aída López as Maricarmen, Valeria's mother
 Martha Claudia Moreno
 Sonia Couoh as Vero, Valeria's sister

Release
Huesera: The Bone Woman had its world premiere at the Tribeca Festival in New York on 9 June 2022, as part of the festival's "Midnight" section.

The film is set to receive a North American theatrical release by XYZ Films on 10 February 2023.  It will be released on the VOD platform Shudder on 16 February 2023.

Critical reception
On the review aggregator website Rotten Tomatoes, Huesera has an approval rating of 97% based on 37 reviews, with an average rating of 7.80/10. Its consensus reads, "A bone-chilling body horror, Huesera offers genre fans a twisted take on What to Expect When You're Expecting."

Varietys Manuel Betancourt called Huesera "at times spine-chillingly terrifying," writing that it "rarely [resorts] to jump scares", relying instead on "increasingly disturbing imagery" and sound design. Betancourt concluded: "A fable of modern motherhood, of calcified feminist ideas about domesticity and women's agency, Huesera offers a Mexican folk-inspired spin on such horror classics as The Babadook, Hereditary, Rosemary's Baby and Boias maneras." Natalia Winkelman of The New York Times commended Solian's performance, the film's shot composition and its themes, writing that the film "raises the provocative idea that motherhood can feel akin to a curse [...] the movie — like many great works of vision, scale be damned — is almost an exorcism itself, stripping away fuss and banalities to expose raw truths."

Michael Gingold of Rue Morgue wrote that the film "inverts the pregnancy-fear subgenre [...] while also paying off the expectations of a genre piece", and called the film "a singular achievement on the international horror scene." Meagan Navarro, in her review of the film for Bloody Disgusting, praised Garza Cervera's direction, writing that "her firm grasp of imagery and tension-building is focused and effective, using fear to engender sympathy with laser precision. Even if Valeria's denial puts her multiple steps behind the viewer, Cervera's strong debut sweeps you up in Valeria's nightmare regardless."

References

External links
 
 

2020s supernatural horror films
2022 horror films
Mexican horror films
Mexican pregnancy films
Body horror films
2020s Mexican films
2022 directorial debut films